Richard D. Murphy (March 10, 1921 – October 22, 1973) was an American professional basketball player. He played for the New York Knicks and Boston Celtics in the Basketball Association of America (BAA). For his career, Murphy averaged 1.1 points per game. 

Murphy played college basketball for the Manhattan Jaspers and earned All-Metropolitan New York Conference honors for all three seasons he played. As team captain, he led the Jaspers to their first National Invitation Tournament (NIT) berth in 1943. Murphy was inducted into the Manhattan College Athletic Hall of Fame in 1982.

Between college and a stint in the NBA, Murphy served in WWII as a US Navy officer.  Murphy followed in the footsteps of his older brother, Jack Murphy, who was a year ahead of him on the Manhattan College men's basketball team and as a WWII Navy officer.

BAA career statistics

Regular season

References

External links

1921 births
1973 deaths
American Basketball League (1925–1955) players
American men's basketball players
Basketball players from New York (state)
Boston Celtics players
Guards (basketball)
Manhattan Jaspers basketball players
New York Knicks players
Paterson Crescents players